There is a mud volcano along the western boundary of the eponymous anticline in Balkan Province, Turkmenistan. The nearest town is Gumdag.

References 

Mud volcanoes